The Monmu period  is a chronological timeframe during the Asuka period of Japanese history. The Mommu period describes a span of years which were considered to have begun in the 1357th year of the Yamato dynasty.

This periodization is consistent with the traditional dates asserted for the reign of Emperor Monmu, from 697 through 707.

Periodization
The adoption of the Sexagenary cycle calendar (Jikkan Jūnishi) in Japan is attributed to Empress Suiko in 604; and this Chinese calendar continued in use throughout the Mommu period.

However, after the reign of Emperor Kōtoku, this method of segmenting time was temporarily abandoned or allowed to lapse. This interval continued during the Monmu period.

Neither Empress Mommu's reign nor the Monmu periodization are included in the list of nengō for this explicit duration of time, which comes after Suchō and before Taihō.

In the post-Taika or pre-Taihō chronology, the first year of Emperor Monmu's reign (文武天皇元年 or 文武統皇1年) is also construed as the first year of the Mommu period (文武1年).

Non-nengō period
Non-nengō periods in the pre-Taihō calendar were published in 1880 by William Bramsen. These were refined in 1952 by Paul Tsuchihashi in Japanese Chronological Tables from 601 to 1872.

The pre-Tahiō calendar included two non-nengō gaps or intervals in the chronological series:
Taika, August 645–February 650.
Hakuchi, February 650–December 654.
Non-nengō dating systems
Shuchō, July–September 686.
Non-nengō dating systems
Taihō, March 701–May 704.
Nengō were not promulgated (or were allowed to lapse) during the gap years between Hakuchi and Shuchō, and in another gap between Shuchō and Taihō.

Events of the Mommu period
 697 (Mommu 1): Empress Jitō abdicates; and her son receives the succession (senso).  Shortly thereafter, Emperor Mommu formally accedes to the throne (sokui).
 697 (Mommu 1): A new period could be said to have commenced at the beginning of the reign of any of the Japanese sovereigns after Kōtoku and including Mommu

See also
 Regnal name
 List of Japanese era names

Notes

References
 Bramsen, William. (1880). Japanese Chronological Tables: Showing the Date, According to the Julian or Gregorian Calendar, of the First Day of Each Japanese Month, from Tai-kwa 1st year to Mei-ji 6th year (645 AD to 1873 AD): with an Introductory Essay on Japanese Chronology and Calendars. Tokyo: Seishi Bunsha. OCLC 35728014
 Brown, Delmer M. and Ichirō Ishida, eds. (1979).  Gukanshō: The Future and the Past. Berkeley: University of California Press. ; OCLC 251325323
 Murray, David. (1894). The Story of Japan. New York, G. P. Putnam's Sons. OCLC 1016340
 Nussbaum, Louis-Frédéric and Käthe Roth. (2005).  Japan encyclopedia. Cambridge: Harvard University Press. ; OCLC 58053128
 Ponsonby-Fane, Richard Arthur Brabazon. (1959).  The Imperial House of Japan. Kyoto: Ponsonby Memorial Society. OCLC 194887
 Titsingh, Isaac. (1834). Nihon Ōdai Ichiran; ou,  Annales des empereurs du Japon.  Paris: Royal Asiatic Society, Oriental Translation Fund of Great Britain and Ireland. OCLC 5850691
 Tsuchihashi, Paul Yashita, S.J. (1952). .  Tokyo: Sophia University. OCLC 001291275
 Varley, H. Paul. (1980). A Chronicle of Gods and Sovereigns: Jinnō Shōtōki of Kitabatake Chikafusa. New York: Columbia University Press.  ; OCLC 6042764
 Zöllner, Reinhard. (2003). Japanische Zeitrechnung: ein Handbuch Munich: Iudicium Verlag. ; OCLC 249297777

External links
 National Diet Library, "The Japanese Calendar" – historical overview plus illustrative images from library's collection

Japanese eras